WHBI-LP (93.1 FM) is a radio station licensed to Grantville, Pennsylvania, United States. The station as of at least 2010 is owned by Harrisburg Area Media Information Corporation.

References

External links
 

HBI-LP
HBI-LP
Dauphin County, Pennsylvania
Grantville, Pennsylvania
Radio stations established in 2007
2007 establishments in Pennsylvania